José Everardo Cristóbal Quirino (born August 11, 1986 in Urandén, Michoacán) is a Mexican sprint canoeist who has been competing since 2005.

His first successful international performance was in 2006, when he won the silver medal in C-1 500 m and the gold medal in C-1 1000 m at the 2006 Central American and Caribbean Games. Later the same year, at the world championships, he surprisingly won the gold medal at C-1 1000 m, becoming the first Mexican to ever do this, and defeating race favorite and olympic medallist Andreas Dittmer, who finished second. For such performance he received the Premio Nacional del Deporte (National Sports Award), which is awarded annually by the Mexican Sports Committee (CONADE - in Spanish). In 2007, he won the gold medal both in C-1 500 m and C-1 1000 m at the 2007 Pan American Games.

Cristóbal competed at the 2008 Summer Olympics in Beijing in three events (C-1 1000 m, C-2 500 m, and C-2 1000 m), but was eliminated in the semifinal round in each event. His best finish was sixth in the C-1 1000 m semifinal.  At the 2012 Summer Olympics, he competed in two events, the C-1 200 m and the C-1 1000 m, finishing in 20th and 10th respectively.

References

2007 Pan American Games profile

1986 births
Canoeists at the 2007 Pan American Games
Canoeists at the 2008 Summer Olympics
Canoeists at the 2011 Pan American Games
Canoeists at the 2012 Summer Olympics
Living people
Mexican male canoeists
Olympic canoeists of Mexico
Sportspeople from Michoacán
Pan American Games bronze medalists for Mexico
ICF Canoe Sprint World Championships medalists in Canadian
Pan American Games medalists in canoeing
Mexican people of Purépecha descent
Central American and Caribbean Games gold medalists for Mexico
Central American and Caribbean Games silver medalists for Mexico
Competitors at the 2006 Central American and Caribbean Games
Central American and Caribbean Games medalists in canoeing
Medalists at the 2011 Pan American Games